Topor may refer to:

Places
 Topor (Barclayville), a village in Barclayville township, Grand Kru County, Liberia
 Topór, a nature reserve in Łuków Forest, Poland
 Topór, Mińsk County, a village in Gmina Mrozy, Mińsk County, Masovian Voivodeship, Poland
 Topór, Węgrów County, a village in Gmina Stoczek, Węgrów County, Masovian Voivodeship, Poland

Films
 Topor and Me, a short film directed by Dutch actress Sylvia Kristel (1952–2012)
 Topor père et fils, a 1993 documentary by Belgian director Henri Xhonneux (1945–1995)

Other
 Topor (headgear), Bengali wedding headwear
 Topor (surname), including a list of people with that name
 Topór coat of arms, a Polish coat of arms
 TopoR, an automated topological router for printed circuit boards

See also